Tenggol Island (Terengganuan: Pula Tenggo) is an island off the coast of Terengganu, Malaysia. It is the last island in a string of islands that include Pulau Perhentian and Pulau Redang. It is connected by ferry to Kuala Dungun on the mainland.

The island was traditionally uninhabited, but now contains hotels. Vietnamese boat people were stranded on the island in aftermath of the Vietnam War.

External links
Malaysia Travel Guide: Tenggol Island
Ping Anchorage : Tenggol Island
 Pulau Tenggol Website

Islands of Terengganu